Jane Rogers may refer to:
 Jane Rogers (novelist), British novelist and scriptwriter
 Jane Rogers (actress, died 1718), English stage actress
 Jane Rogers (actress, died 1739), her daughter, English stage actress
 Jane A. Rogers, American actress
 Jane Margaret Rogers, High Sheriff of Kent